P. koreana may refer to:
 Phyllonorycter koreana, a moth species found in Korea
 Pterotopteryx koreana, a moth species found in Korea
 Pulsatilla koreana, the Korean pasque flower, a plant species native to Korea

See also 
 Koreana (disambiguation)